The Letov Š-5 was a light scout aircraft built by Letov in the early 1920s.

Design
The Š-5 was similar to the Letov Š-1 in armament and equipment. However, the weight was greater, and the fuselage was stronger and easier to repair. Only one aircraft was built, serving in an aviation school in Cheb until 1930.

Specifications

References

Further reading
 

1920s Czechoslovakian military reconnaissance aircraft
S-5
Biplanes
Single-engined tractor aircraft
Aircraft first flown in 1923